Chris Swedzinski (born May 10, 1978) is an American politician serving in the Minnesota House of Representatives since 2011. A member of the Republican Party of Minnesota, Swedzinski represents District 15A in southwest Minnesota, which includes the city of Marshall, the counties of Lac qui Parle, Lyon and Yellow Medicine, and parts of Chippewa County.

Early education and career
Swedzinski graduated from Minneota High School in Minneota, then went on to Ridgewater College in Willmar and Minnesota State University in Mankato, earning his B.S. in history and political science. He served as a district representative for former U.S. Representative Mark Kennedy for five years, and also worked as a Rural Development Specialist for the United States Department of Agriculture, designing and facilitating outreach plans and strategies for rural businesses and renewable energy efforts. He and his family live and farm near Ghent.

Minnesota House of Representatives
Swedzinski was elected to the Minnesota House of Representatives in 2010, succeeding Marty Seifert, who did not seek reelection, and has been reelected every two years since. He ran on a platform of cutting taxes, reducing the size of government, and empowering the individual.

Swedzinski was an assistant majority leader during the 2015-16 legislative session, and chaired the Subcommittee on Mining, Forestry, & Tourism, a subcommittee of the Environment & Natural Resources Policy and Finance Committee, in 2017-18. He is the minority lead on the Climate and Energy Finance and Policy Committee and sits on the Taxes Committee.

Electoral history

References

External links 

 Rep. Swedzinski Web Page
 Project Votesmart - Rep. Chris Swedzinski Profile
 Chris Swedzinski Campaign Web Site

1978 births
Living people
People from Lyon County, Minnesota
Republican Party members of the Minnesota House of Representatives
21st-century American politicians
Minnesota State University, Mankato alumni